Plob may refer to:
Plob, an organization from the Nintendo DS game Dragon Quest Heroes: Rocket Slime
Petty Little Odious Bid (PLOB), a term for the New Minor Forcing convention in the card game contract bridge
Friedrich Plöb, see: Odilo Globocnik

See also
Blob (disambiguation)